Franz Pelikan (6 November 1925 – 21 March 1994) was an Austrian football goalkeeper who played for Austria in the 1948 Summer Olympics and 1954 FIFA World Cup. He also played for FC Admira Wacker Mödling.

References

External links

1925 births
1994 deaths
Austrian footballers
Austria international footballers
Association football goalkeepers
FC Admira Wacker Mödling players
1954 FIFA World Cup players
Footballers at the 1948 Summer Olympics
Olympic footballers of Austria